José Antonio Casanova (February 18, 1918 – July 8, 1999) was a shortstop and manager in Venezuelan baseball. He batted and threw right handed.

Born in Maracaibo, Zulia, Casanova is regarded as the most successful manager in Venezuelan baseball history. A five-time championship manager, he also led his teams to several international titles in a career that spanned more than three decades.

During this stint he also played for the Venezuela national baseball team that captured the 1941 Amateur World Series championship in Havana, in which he won the AWS Most Valuable Player honors.   

He then launched a fruitful managing career in the VPBL through the 1966 season, winning four titles with the Cervecería Caracas (1947–1948), Leones del Caracas (1952) and Tiburones de la Guaira (1964). Overall, he posted a 436–402 record for a .520 winning percentage.

In addition, he guided the Venezuelan team that clinched championships in the Baseball World Cup in 1944 and 1945, as well as the team that won gold medal at the 1959 Pan American Games held in Chicago. Besides this, he served as manager for the Venezuelan Military Academy team during 29 years. A baseball park in Caracas is named after him.

In 2003, José Antonio Casanova was enshrined into the Venezuelan Baseball Hall of Fame and Museum as part of their first class. He was inducted as well in the Hall in 2006, when the entire 1941 AWS Champion Team was honored. Then, in 2015 he earned a third induction when the 1959 PanAm Games Champion Team was enshrined.

Sources

1918 births 
1999 deaths
Baseball managers
Caribbean Series managers
Cervecería Caracas players
Sportspeople from Maracay
Sportspeople from Maracaibo
Venezuelan baseball players